The 1990 AFL draft was the 5th annual draft of Australian rules footballers to the 14 clubs in the Australian Football League.  It consisted of the national draft held at the end of the 1990 season, the pre-season draft held before the 1991 AFL season, and a mid-season draft.

Clubs receive picks based on the reverse of the position in which they finish on the ladder during the season.  This was introduced as an equalisation strategy in response to the increasing transfer fees and player salaries.

National draft rules 
The minimum draft age for the 1990 national draft was 16. Other than the West Coast Eagles, clubs were allowed to select only one West Australian player each and South Australian players were restricted to be only selected by the Adelaide Football Club which would join the AFL for the 1991 AFL season. Players in Queensland, New South Wales and the Australian Capital Territory could only be selected by clubs other than the Brisbane Bears and the Sydney Swans respectively if the player was older than 19 and not required by the 'local' club. Faced with these restrictions the league reduced the number of choices from 8 to 6. In exchange for the SA moratorium, the Crows were excluded from the draft (they could pick any South Australian, but only South Australians).

Background 
The talent pool was clearly shallow and most clubs shied away from investing too much hope in the draft. A number of the Victorian clubs, notably Richmond and Fitzroy, couldn't afford to recruit established players so stuck with country footballers and unproven youngsters. Clubs were believed to be looking to Tasmania as perhaps the only recruiting ground which hadn't been ravaged.
The under-19's competition was still in operation and clubs had only to list players who had been drafted, and those over the age of 19. Essendon and North Melbourne at this point for example had very talented reserves sides drawn from their metropolitan zones (these zones would later provide the basis for the Northern Knights under-18 teams).

Pre-draft 
Pre-draft picks included Brisbane taking Darryl White from the Northern Territory which had become their 'zone'. Mitchell White and Glen Jakovich were fair additions to the West Coast Eagles squad.
There were a number of notable trades. Brisbane traded Mark Roberts to North Melbourne who also secured Peter Mann from the Eagles. Geelong gave up forwards David Cameron and Shane Hamilton to get Brisbane's number 1 draft pick. The most noteworthy trade though was Hawthorn getting the rights to Darren Jarman, who turned down the chance to join the Adelaide Crows. Incidentally the Rohan Smith listed is the St Kilda one, not the Footscray one. Future Channel 7 commentator Russell Morris left Hawthorn for St Kilda.

Players 
Richmond drafted Matthew Clarke and Nick Daffy. Despite the restrictions on recruiting South Australians, Richmond skirted the rule because these two played in Mount Gambier and were registered with clubs in the Western Border Football League (VCFL). Melbourne drafted Allen Jakovich, who although a Western Australian was playing for South Australian National Football League (SANFL) side Woodville, and Brisbane were able to draft two Western Australian Football League (WAFL) players in Peter Worsfold (John's brother) and David Ogg. Matt Clape, Jakovich, Todd Ridley, James Cook, Jason McCartney, Scott Crow, Matthew Young, Stuart Anderson and Paul Sharkey were modestly successful. Matthew Burton, Fabian Francis and Derek Hall would all find success at different AFL clubs.

The only two definite successes were James Hird and Jamie Shanahan.

Bits and pieces 
Jason McCartney kept a diary on behalf of The Age newspaper detailing the weeks leading up to the draft. In it he reveals the confusion and uncertainty that a young footballer feels. McCartney from Nhill in Victoria (near the SA border) was hesitant about moving to Melbourne. He went to Adelaide as a guest of Glenelg Football Club and watched the AFL grand final on the big screen, as well as watching Glenelg lose the SA Grand Final the next day.

With Sydney and Brisbane having the first draft picks he signed for Glenelg on a two-year deal. When Sydney and Brisbane traded their selections his hopes lifted. Geelong told him that they would take Hooper first and would be attempting to get the second pick to take McCartney. Geelong were unable to manufacture a trade and Carlton ended up with the selection (they swapped ruckman Warren McKenzie to Sydney). Ian Collins, Geoff Walsh, Bruce Comben and Kinnear Beatson all drove up to Nhill to meet with McCartney, and the next morning David Parkin rang him to ask if everything went well.

On draft day Carlton opted for Tasmanian James Cook. Parkin said that he felt that Cook had the potential to be an even better player. Collingwood drafted him and McCartney openly admitted he was devastated and that Collingwood was last on his list of clubs.

The trades which made the above possible were Carlton swapping McKenzie to Sydney for 2 pick overall, and Collingwood swapping Terry Keays to Richmond for 4th pick overall. One recruiting officer commenting about the decision making of Sydney and Richmond said, "those clubs deserve to be in the position they are in if they are going to make choices like that".

Preseason 
Michael McLean joined the Brisbane Bears after having been not encouraged to stay with Footscray. Sean Simpson switched from St Kilda to Geelong and the Cats again demonstrated their ability to revive careers. David Cloke was encouraged to saddle up for one more season at Richmond who was finding recruiting a ruckman nearly impossible. Kevin Dyson was recruited to Melbourne. Collingwood audaciously recruited the recently retired Gerard Healy in the hope of persuading him to play on, but he didn't.

Pre-draft picks

Pre-draft trades

1990 mid-season draft

1990 national draft

1991 pre-season draft

References

External links 
 The Complete AFL draft
 Official AFL draft page
 AFL draft

Australian Football League draft
Afl draft, 1990